The Boat Builder is a 2015 American independent drama film directed by Arnold Grossman and starring Christopher Lloyd and Jane Kaczmarek.  It is Grossman's directorial debut.  It is based on a novel by Grossman.

Premise
An embittered old mariner and an unwanted young orphan form an unlikely bond building a boat.

Cast
Christopher Lloyd as Abner
Jane Kaczmarek as Katherine
David Lascher as Charles
Jeffrey Weissman as Bud
Rachel Resheff as Ruth
Derek Stefan as Officer Grigsby
Joseph John Schirle as Duffy
Heather Mathieson as Jean
Apeksha Pradhan as Insurance Agent
Tekola Cornetet as Rick

Production
Bruce Dern was initially considered for the role of Abner.

The film was shot in the San Francisco Bay Area.  The sound recording of the film occurred in Colorado.

Release
The film made its worldwide premiere at the 30th Fort Lauderdale International Film Festival on November 6, 2015.

References

External links
 
 

American independent films
American drama films
2015 directorial debut films
2015 films
Films based on American novels
Films shot in San Francisco
Films shot in California
2015 drama films
2015 independent films
2010s English-language films
2010s American films